Wheatleigh is a historic country estate on West Hawthorne Road in Stockbridge, Massachusetts, United States. Built in 1893 to a design by Peabody and Stearns, it is one of the few surviving great Berkshire Cottages of the late 19th century, with grounds landscaped by Frederick Law Olmsted. It is now operated as a hotel.

Description and history
Wheatleigh is located in far northeastern Stockbridge, just south of the Tanglewood facility of the Boston Symphony Orchestra on the east side of West Hawthorne Road. The estate is located atop a knoll from which there are commanding views of Stockbridge Bowl to the west. The remnant portion of the estate includes only the main house and water tower of the formerly  property, which also included greenhouses, a large garage with apartments above, an icehouse, barn, and three gatehouses. The house is a large -story masonry building, with Mediterranean Revival styling. It is organized in a U shape, with a central main block, a bedroom wing to the north, and a loggia and "summer house" to the south. It is built out of buff brick with terra cotta trim.

Henry H. Cook was a New York-based businessman who made his fortune in the railroad and banking businesses.  He purchased the undeveloped estate land in 1892, and oversaw construction and landscaping of the property.  He named it Wheatleigh, in homage to his family's ancestral home, Wheatley, Oxfordshire.  The house, designed by the Boston architectural firm of Peabody and Stearns, received notice in architectural publications, and was described by Charles McKim as one of the best examples of modern Italian Villa architecture.

The property passed to Cook's daughter, Gloria de Heredia, who opened the formal gardens on the grounds for vespers church services in the summer, and was a financial backer behind the establishment of Tanglewood.  The estate was sold out of the Cook family in 1946, and the  house grounds were subdivided off soon afterward.  The property was owned by the Boston Symphony Orchestra between 1949 and 1957.  Since 1976 it has served as a hotel.

See also
 National Register of Historic Places listings in Berkshire County, Massachusetts

References

External links
 Wheatleigh Official website

Houses completed in 1893
Houses in Berkshire County, Massachusetts
Peabody and Stearns buildings
Stockbridge, Massachusetts
Houses on the National Register of Historic Places in Berkshire County, Massachusetts
Hotels in Massachusetts
Gilded Age mansions